Who’s There? is a 2022 Russian thriller film directed by Vladimir Maslov, Vitaly Dudka and Mikhail Morskov. Dudka and Morskov are also screenwriters, along with Mikhail Sokolovsky and Goga Poberezhnyy. This film was theatrically released on September 15, 2022 by Central Partnership.

Plot 
The film tells about a billionaire, an airplane pilot, an aspiring police officer and a young woman with her daughter, who are forced to face the unknown and understand themselves in order to realize what their fears are.

Cast 
 Vladimir Mashkov as Pavel
 Aleksandra Bortich as mother
 Kirill Käro as Pyotr
 Tikhon Zhiznevsky as Malinin
 Aleksandr Samoylenko as Sergeyich
 Aleksandr Oblasov as Dymov
 Pelageya Nevzorova as Katya
 Maryana Spivak as mother
 Nikolai Kovbas as businessman
 Pelageya Nevzorova as Katya

Production 
Filming wrapped in June 2022. Specialists from Dudka Films, Zoom Production and Neopoleon Studio worked on it, and Central Partnership is the distributor.

The locations were Moscow, as well as the Urban-type settlement of Bolshaya Izhora, which is located in the Leningrad Oblast. The main difficulty, according to the creators, was to shoot everything planned in a single take. This created the effect of complete immersion.

References

External links 
 

2022 films
2020s Russian-language films
2022 thriller films
Russian thriller films
Russian anthology films